Parliamentary elections were held in Ecuador on 17 June 1990. Only the 60 district members of the House of Representatives were elected. The Social Christian Party emerged as the largest party, winning 15 of the 60 seats.

Results

References

Elections in Ecuador
1990 in Ecuador
Ecuador